The Wild Bunch: An Album in Montage is a 1996 American short documentary film directed and edited by Paul Seydor. The occasion for the creation of this documentary was the discovery of 72 minutes of silent black-and-white 16 mm film footage of Sam Peckinpah and company on location in northern Mexico during the filming of The Wild Bunch.

Cast
Source:
 Walon Green as himself (voice)
 Newell Alexander as Cliff Coleman, William Holden (voice)
 Edmond O'Brien as himself (voice)
 James R. Silke as Friend / colleague (voice) (as Jim Silke)
 Mitch Carter as Gordon Dawson, Strother Martin (voice)
 Jerry Fielding as himself (voice)
 Sharon Peckinpah as herself (voice)
 L. Q. Jones as himself (voice)
 Ernest Borgnine as himself (voice)
 Peter Rainer as Bud Hulburd (voice)
 Ed Harris as Sam Peckinpah (voice)

Reception
Michael Sragow wrote that the film is "a wonderful introduction to Peckinpah’s radically detailed historical film about American outlaws in revolutionary Mexico — a masterpiece that’s part bullet-driven ballet, part requiem for Old West friendship and part existential explosion. Seydor’s movie is also a poetic flight on the myriad possibilities of movie directing." Seydor and Redman were nominated for the Academy Award for Best Documentary (Short Subject).

Home media
The documentary was included on the 2006 and 2007 DVD and Blu-ray releases of The Wild Bunch.

References

External links

The Wild Bunch: An Album in Montage on MUBI
Review

1996 documentary films
1996 films
1996 short films
1990s short documentary films
American short documentary films
Documentary films about films
1990s English-language films
1990s American films